The Shanghai Campaign was a series of battles fought between the nationalists and the communists for the control of Shanghai, the largest city in China in the latter stage of the Chinese Civil War, and resulted in the city being taken over by the communists, who enjoyed numerical superiority.

Prelude 
With a population of six million, Shanghai was the largest city in China in 1949 and provided around a third of the total GDP of China by that time.  Both the communists and the nationalists believed that World War III was a real possibility and this perception influenced the strategic decisions of both sides.

The nationalists who defended the city had hoped that by using the resources of China's wealthiest city, they could last until World War III when foreign intervention would occur. With foreign intervention, not only they would be able to defend the city, but also counterattack and take China back.  If the city could not last until World War III, the nationalists could withdraw via sea and transfer the wealth with them, after destroying the city completely, as in the scorched earth policy used against the Japanese invaders in many parts of China during World War II.  Although the truthfulness of this perception of the nationalists remained in question, the enemy certainly believed that there was a possibility, as the nationalist propaganda had claimed, and thus was determined not to let it happen by taking the city as early as possible.

Defending force: the nationalist strategy 
The nationalist commander divided the city into two sectors along the Huangpu River.  The western half of the city and the surrounding regions including Taicang, Kunshan, Jiaxing, and Golden Mountain Jinshan, were defended by a total of 20 divisions (including all of the armored force) belonging to the 21st Army, the 51st Army, the 52nd Army, the 54th Army, the 75th Army and the 123rd Army.  The 12th Army and the 35th Army totaled five divisions and the naval and air assets were tasked to defend Pudong, with emphasis on regions included Wusong, Yuepu (月浦), Yanghang (杨行), Liuhang (刘行), Dachang (大场), Gaohang (高行), and Gaoqiao, in order to secure the escape route via sea.  The nationalist force defending the city totaled more than 210,000.  The buildings in the city were perfect defending positions which were further boosted by large amount of the concrete bunkers built.

Attacking force: the communist strategy 
The PLA 3rd Field Army under the commander-in-chief Chen Yi and deputy commander-in-chief Su Yu was tasked to take the city.  The communists massed more than 290,000 troops totaled 10 armies to attack the city, while the communist 2nd Field Army under the commander-in-chief Liu Bocheng and political commissar Deng Xiaoping massed at Jinhua and Dongxiang (东乡) via Zhejiang-Jiangxi railway, in order to prevent any foreign intervention that never came.  The primary goal of the communists was to take the city with minimal damage to the city and minimal civilian casualties, so that future reconstruction would be easy by utilizing the existing infrastructure and skilled labor force.  To prevent the defenders from transferring large amount of wealth via sea, a pincer movement would be launched from both the east and west, targeting Wusong, so that the defenders' escape route via sea would be cut and the city would be attacked afterward and by isolating the defenders into separate pockets, and then the city would be taken by decimating the isolated defenders.

One prong of the communist pincer movement included the 26th Army, the 28th Army, the 29th Army, the 33rd Army of the communist X Corps and a part of the communist Artillery Column attacking from Changshu and Suzhou toward Kunshan, Taicang, and Jiading, eventually reaching Wusong, thus blocking off the defenders' escape route via sea by cutting off the traffic of Huangpu River.  Afterward, this prong of the pincer movement would attack the city from northwest.

The other prong of the communist pincer movement included the 20th Army, the 27th Army, 30th Army, and the 31st Army of the communist IX Corps and a part of communist Artillery Column.  Two armies would attack from Nanxun and Wujiang, toward Fengxian, Nanhui, Chuansha regions near/in Pudong, helping the communist X Corps to blockade the Wusong after approaching Gaoqiao.  Another two armies would group at the regions south of Songjiang and east of Jiaxing, taking Qingpu when the situation permitted, and then attack the city from the east, south and west.

In case of the defenders were successful in transferring materials away from the city, the attackers also prepared large amount of food and coal for the civilian population, and over 5,000 communist civilian cadres were also drafted to take over the administrative functions after the city was taken.

Order of battle 
Defenders: Republic of China Armed Forces order of battle:
 The 21st Army
 The 51st Army
 The 52nd Army
 The 54th Army
 The 75th Army
 The 123rd Army
 The 12th Army
 The 35th Army
 The 1st Naval District
 Air Force units
 5 Traffic Police Divisions

Attackers: People's Liberation Army order of battle:
 The 20th Army of the IX Corps
 The 23rd Army of the VII Corps
 The 25th Army of the VIII Corps
 The 26th Army of the X Corps
 The 27th Army of the IX Corps
 The 28th Army of the X Corps
 The 29th Army of the X Corps
 The 30th Army of the IX Corps
 The 31st Army of the IX Corps
 The 33rd Army of the X Corps
 The Artillery Column

First stage 
The campaign began on May 12, 1949, when the planned assaults on the outer defense perimeters of the city had begun.  Two days later, the communist IX Corps succeeded in taking regions included Pinghu, Jinshanwei (金山卫), Fengxian, Nanhui, Qingpu, Songjiang, threatened the flank of the defenders at Chuansha.  The nationalist 51st Army was forced to be redeployed from the city to strengthen the defense of Bailonggang (白龙港), Lin's Family's Pier (Linjia Matou, 林家码头) and other positions at outer defensive zones.  Meanwhile, the communist X Corps succeeded in taking Taicang, Kunshan, Jiading, and Liuhe, and continued their attack on Yuepu, Yanghang, and Liuhang.  However, from their concrete bunkers and with the help of naval and air support, the defenders held on and when the nationalist 99th Division of the 21st Army was redeployed from the city to Yuepu, Yanghang, and Liuhang for reinforcement, the defenders was able to beat back the attacking enemy.

After the setback, the Communists adjusted their tactic by adopting small formations to take one bunker at a time, and with the rapid utilization of the experienced gained in fighting against the fortified positions consisted of concrete bunkers, the speed of attack was greatly accelerated.  By May 19, 1949, the communist X Corps had managed to take Yuepu and the International Broadcasting Station, and annihilated the defenders stationed at Liuhang.  Meanwhile, the communist IX Corps had managed to take Zhoupu (周浦) and Chuansha, and completely annihilated the nationalist 51st Army defending Bailonggang, and isolated the nationalist 12th Army at Gaoqiao, while cutting off the links between the nationalist 37 Army at Pudong with other nationalist units via land.

Second stage 
To secure the escape route via sea, the nationalist 75th Army was redeployed from the city to reinforce Gaoqiao, but after two armies and a division were withdrawn from the city to reinforce the positions of outer defensive perimeters, there was not enough force within the city to suppress the civilians who vehemently opposed the destruction of the city and organized themselves to protect infrastructure facilities within the city.  As a result, the nationalist plan of destroying the city and transferring the wealth was not carried out fully as it had planned.  The defenders' naval assets also faced great difficulties in that it was forced to fight at the enemy's turf: the inland riverine navigational channels were simply too narrow for the naval vessels to maneuver and they become sitting ducks for the enemy's long range shore batteries.  After many extraordinarily brave but completely futile engagements by the outgunned nationalist naval assets which resulted in seven nationalist naval vessels damaged, it was painfully obvious that the naval asset must withdraw in the hopeless fights.  When the nationalist naval fleet was forced to withdraw on May 23, 1949, the enemy's attempt to cut off the defenders' maritime escape route succeeded, and the sea to the east of Gaoqiao was blockaded by the enemy.

After ten days of fierce fighting, the defenders suffered more than 20,000 casualties and lost all of the positions in the outer defensive perimeters.  However, this might not be a bad thing because the defenders were able to concentrate their force in the city.  The attacking enemy was well aware of this situation and adjusted their tactic once again:  the 23rd Army of the communist VII Corps and the 25th Army of the communist VIII Corps were assigned to help the communist IX Corps and X Corps to take the city.

Third stage 
The assault on the city begun at the night of May 23, 1949 when the communist 29th Army took the high ground in the southern suburb under the cover of darkness, while the communist 28th Army penetrated to Wusong and shelled the pier.  On May 24, 1949, the communist 20th Army took Pudong and the communist 27th Army took the train station at Xujiahui and Hongqiao.  The nationalist commander-in-chief, Tang Enbo already boarded naval ships on May 18, 1949, realized the inevitable and in order to strengthen the defense around the pier at Wusong,  ordered the surviving 6th Division of the nationalist 75th Army at Gaoqiao to withdraw to Yuepu, and the nationalist units north of Suzhou Creek to withdraw to Wusong, for the preparation to withdraw via sea.

Under the cover of darkness, the communist 23rd Army and the 27th Army penetrated the city from Xujiahui and Longhua respectively while the communist 20th Army crossed the Huangpu River at Gaochangmiao (高昌庙) and by the dawn of May 25, 1949, everything south of the Suzhou Creek was firmly under the communist control.  The enemy's offensive continued during the day with the communist 26th Army took Dachang and Jiangwan, and the communist 25th Army and the 29th Army took Wusong and Baoshan, while the communist 28th Army and the 33rd Army took Yanghang.  At night, the communist 27th Army, 23rd Army and a portion of the 20th Army crossed the Suzhou Creek under the cover of darkness, and regions north of the creek fell into the attackers' hands.  The deputy commander of the Shanghai defense, the commander of the Shanghai garrison, General Liu Changyi (刘昌义) was forced to surrender.

At the night of May 25, 1949, the communist 31st Army took Gaoqiao with the help of the communist 30th Army after fierce battle, and by the noon of May 26, 1949, the last defense in Pudong was wiped out.  By May 27, 1949, the city had fallen to the enemy hands.  Soon afterward, the communist 25th Army launched its assault on Chongming Island and badly mauled the defending force, and by June 2, 1949, the campaign had ended with the communist victory completed.

Outcome 
The campaign had cost the city's defenders heavily.  50,000 defenders including the nationalist commander-in-chief Tang Enbo managed to escape via sea, but the entire 37th Army, the 51st Army and the 5 Traffic Police Divisions were annihilated, while the nationalist 12th Army, 21st Army, 52nd Army, 75th Army, and the 123rd Army were badly mauled.  Total nationalist casualties numbered more than 153,000.  In addition to the city, more than 1,370 artillery pieces of various caliber, 1,161 automobiles, 11 naval vessels and 119 tanks and armored vehicles were captured by the enemy intact.  Although the nationalists attempted to completely destroy the city, the communists nonetheless managed to take the city relatively intact due to the local populace's strong opposition to their intended scorched earth policy.

The nationalists had committed a serious blunder before the campaign had even begun in that for political and psychological propaganda reasons, they had refused to evacuate the city. The local populace was not allowed by the defenders to leave the city to surrender to the attacking enemy either and thus when the battle began, there were not enough transportation assets to evacuate everyone so the stranded populace felt helpless and abandoned.

As the nationalists attempted to leave nothing behind for the attacking enemy by trying to destroy the city and transfer its wealth, such actions enraged the local populace because they threatened necessities essential to their survival. Had the nationalists’ plan succeeded, the stranded local populace that was already ravaged by the fierce battle would be left in even greater destitution after the campaign.  Like the general populace elsewhere in China, the stranded local populace in Shanghai was already alienated by the mistakes nationalists made earlier, such as corruption, but at least they were not unanimously against the nationalists regime, at least not yet.

When the nationalist defenders of the city adopted these strategies, causing great harm to the local populace, it produced popular alienation toward the nationalist regime and boosted the appeal of the communist side. Although communist agents certainly played a part in organizing the local populace to protect factories, banks, shops and other infrastructure facilities, which had prevented the nationalists from carrying out the scorch-earth policy as they had planned, these actions were mostly voluntary at the local people's own will out of concern for their survival after the campaign, which would be dependent on this infrastructure, rather than out of a desire to help the attacking communists.

Another mistake committed by the nationalists was strategic in nature: spending too many resources defending a political symbol instead of focusing on evacuating the city and transferring the wealth. Much of the nationalists’ military resources were spent at Shanghai, leaving other regions vulnerable, and the communist VII Corps was able to take advantage by seizing Ningbo and Wenzhou during the campaign.  As a result, not only was the city lost to the communists in a relatively intact state, along with a great portion of its wealth, but many other surrounding regions also fell, enriching the communist forces.

See also 
 List of Battles of Chinese Civil War
 National Revolutionary Army
 History of the People's Liberation Army

References 
 Zhu, Zongzhen and Wang, Chaoguang, Liberation War History, 1st Edition, Social Scientific Literary Publishing House in Beijing, 2000,  (set)
 Zhang, Ping, History of the Liberation War, 1st Edition, Chinese Youth Publishing House in Beijing, 1987,  (pbk.)
 Jie, Lifu, Records of the Liberation War: The Decisive Battle of Two Kinds of Fates, 1st Edition, Hebei People's Publishing House in Shijiazhuang, 1990,  (set)
 Literary and Historical Research Committee of the Anhui Committee of the Chinese People's Political Consultative Conference, Liberation War, 1st Edition, Anhui People's Publishing House in Hefei, 1987, 
 Li, Zuomin, Heroic Division and Iron Horse: Records of the Liberation War, 1st Edition, Chinese Communist Party History Publishing House in Beijing, 2004, 
 Wang, Xingsheng, and Zhang, Jingshan, Chinese Liberation War, 1st Edition, People's Liberation Army Literature and Art Publishing House in Beijing, 2001,  (set)
 Huang, Youlan, History of the Chinese People's Liberation War, 1st Edition, Archives Publishing House in Beijing, 1992, 
 Liu Wusheng, From Yan'an to Beijing: A Collection of Military Records and Research Publications of Important Campaigns in the Liberation War, 1st Edition, Central Literary Publishing House in Beijing, 1993, 
 Tang, Yilu and Bi, Jianzhong, History of Chinese People's Liberation Army in Chinese Liberation War, 1st Edition, Military Scientific Publishing House in Beijing, 1993 – 1997,  (Volum 1), 7800219615 (Volum 2), 7800219631 (Volum 3), 7801370937 (Volum 4), and 7801370953 (Volum 5)

Conflicts in 1949
Battles of the Chinese Civil War
1949 in China
20th century in Shanghai